Bynum may refer to:

People with the surname
 Andrew Bynum (born 1987), American basketball player
 Clarke Bynum, American basketball player
 Freddie Bynum, American baseball player
 G. T. Bynum, American politician; mayor of Tulsa, Oklahoma
 Janelle Bynum, American politician
 Jesse Atherton Bynum, American congressman
 Juanita Bynum (born 1959), American author and televangelist
 Kenny Bynum, American football player
 Mike Bynum,  American baseball player
 Preston Bynum (1939-2018), American politician and lobbyist
 Reggie Bynum, American football player
 Sarah Shun-lien Bynum, American writer
 Taylor Ho Bynum, musician
 Terrell Ward Bynum, American philosopher
 Will Bynum, American basketball player
 W. F. Bynum (born 1943),  British historian of medicine

Places

United States
 Bynum, Alabama
 Bynum, Texas
 Bynum, North Carolina
 Bynum, Montana